This is a list of University of South Florida Bulls  in the NFL Draft.

Key

Selections

References

South Florida Bulls

South Florida Bulls NFL Draft